Flying Fox Neemrana is an Indian zipwire, dubbed India's first Zip Tour. The Zip Tour is situated on an outcrop of the Aravali hill range.

Flying Fox Neemrana was inaugurated on 18 January 2009 by Sri Banerjee, Secretary of Tourism, Government of India and Sir Richard Stagg KCMG, British High Commissioner to India.

Location 
The Zip Tour is located in Neemrana, with views of Neemrana Fort Palace, the Aravali hills and the surrounding countryside of Rajasthan.

Lines

There are five lines at the location, navigated in a 2-3 hour tour.

References

External links
 http://www.flyingfox.asia/

Tourist attractions in Alwar district
Adventure tourism in India
Zip lines
Neemrana